Archbold's Castle is a castle and a National Monument in Dalkey, Ireland.

Location

History

Archbold's Castle was formerly a fortified warehouse, of which two storeys remain. A machicolation is visible above the doorway. Of seven castles which once stood in Dalkey, only two remain, Archbold's and Goat Castle. Archbold is a Hiberno-Norman surname, ultimately from Norman Archambault (ercan meaning "precious" + bald meaning "bold").

References

National Monuments in County Dublin